David Cienciala (born 1 December 1995) is a Czech professional ice hockey player. He is currently playing for HC Oceláři Třinec of the Czech Extraliga.

Cienciala made his Czech Extraliga debut playing with HC Oceláři Třinec during the 2014-15 Czech Extraliga season.

References

External links

1995 births
Living people
HC Oceláři Třinec players
Czech ice hockey forwards
Sportspeople from Třinec
BK Mladá Boleslav players
HC Dynamo Pardubice players
LHK Jestřábi Prostějov players
Lukko players
Czech expatriate ice hockey players in Finland
HC Frýdek-Místek players